Bates v. City of Little Rock, 361 U.S. 516 (1960), was a case in which the Supreme Court of the United States held that the First Amendment to the U.S. Constitution forbade state government to compel the disclosure of an organization's membership lists via a tax-exemption regulatory scheme.

This was a companion case to NAACP v. Alabama (1958), which also held that NAACP membership records are protected by First Amendment freedom of association, and Talley v. California (1960), which held that Talley, a civil rights activist, could not be fined for an anonymous flyer. These cases help establish the right to privacy under the First Amendment, expanded on in Roe v. Wade (1973) and Brown v. Socialist Workers '74 Campaign Committee (1982).

See also
List of United States Supreme Court cases, volume 361

External links

United States Supreme Court cases
United States Supreme Court cases of the Warren Court
United States freedom of association case law
1960 in United States case law
History of Little Rock, Arkansas
Civil rights movement case law